The Aga Khan Sports Club Ground is a cricket ground in Nairobi, Kenya. The ground is used by Aga Khan Sports Club cricket team. The pitch is considered to be one of the fastest in Kenya, and the venue hosted four One Day Internationals between 1996 and 1997.

Kenya have played first-class matches here against Pakistan A and Namibia, and eight matches were played here during the 1994 ICC Trophy.

ODI's Hosted

List of Five Wicket Hauls

One Day Internationals

References

Sport in Nairobi
Cricket grounds in Kenya
Sports venues completed in 1985
1985 establishments in Kenya